NNLS may refer to

 Non-negative least squares, an optimization problem in mathematics
 New North London Synagogue, see Sternberg Centre